Colonel Robert Trimble (1824 – 5 September 1899) was a 19th-century Member of Parliament in Taranaki, New Zealand. He was briefly a judge at the Native Land Court.

Early life
Trimble was born near Belfast, Ireland, in 1824. He did his apprenticeship as a spinner at Sion Mills. He emigrated to America at age 21, where he remained for two or three years. While there, he was exposed to William Henry Channing's unitarianism, which he adopted instead of his presbyterian upbringing. He then moved to Manchester and then to Liverpool, where he worked for the American linen commission merchants Watson and Co.

In 1856, he married Jane Heywood of Manchester. She was the eldest daughter of Abel Heywood, who at the time was alderman and later became Mayor of Manchester. Their son William Hayward Trimble became the first librarian at the Hocken Collections.

While in Manchester, he became interested in the volunteer movement and he joined the Liverpool Irish. He then joined the 15th Lancashire Artillery Volunteers, where he financed an additional battery. He was appointed lieutenant-colonel and upon leaving Manchester, was promoted to honorary colonel. The leading personalities of Manchester attended his leaving dinner in 1875.

Political career

After the abolition of provincial government, he became the first chairman of the Inglewood Town Board.

Later, he was a judge at the Native Land Court.

Death
Trimble died on 5 September 1899 at New Plymouth after having been unwell for a long time. He was survived by his wife, four sons and three daughters.

References

|-

1824 births
1899 deaths
Military personnel from Belfast
Royal Artillery officers
Members of the New Zealand House of Representatives
Unsuccessful candidates in the 1887 New Zealand general election
Unsuccessful candidates in the 1893 New Zealand general election
New Zealand MPs for North Island electorates
Irish emigrants to New Zealand (before 1923)
19th-century New Zealand politicians